Shim Hyung-rae (born January 3, 1958, sometimes credited as Hyung Rae Shim) is a South Korean former comedian and filmmaker best known for directing Yonggary and D-War, by far the most expensive Korean movie in history. He has often worked with fellow directors Nam Gi-nam and Kim Cheong-gi.

Selected filmography 
as a producer
D-War: Mysteries of the Dragon (디워: 미스테리즈 오브 더 드래곤, 디워2, D-War2, Dragon Wars2) (2028)
as a director
The Last Godfather (라스트 갓파더, The Dumb Mafia) (2010)
D-War (디 워 Dragon War) (2007)
Yonggary (용가리 Yong-gari) (1999)
Dragon Tuka (드래곤 투카 Deuraegon Tuka) (1996)
The Power King (파워킹 Paweo King) (1995)
Tirano's Claws (티라노의 발톱 Tirano-ui Baltop) (1994)
Pinky Can (핑크빛 깡통 Pingkibit Ggang-tong) (1994)
Young-Goo and Dinosaur Zu-Zu (영구와 공룡 쭈쭈 Yeong-gu wa gongnyong Jju-jju ) (1993)

as an actor
The Dumb Mafia (라스트 갓파더, The Last Godfather) (2010)
Ureme 8 (1993)
An Idiot and a Thief (머저리와 도둑놈 Meojeoriwa Doduknom) (1992)
Ureme 7: The Return of Ureme우뢰매 7:돌아온 우뢰매 (Ulemae 7: Dolaon Ulemae) (1992)
Spark Man (스파크맨 Seupakeumaen) (1988)
Slap on the Cheek Several Times (따귀 일곱대 Kka-gwi-ilgopdae) (1987)
New Machine Uremae 5 (뉴머신 우뢰매 (제5탄) Nyu Meosin Uroemae (Je 5 tan) (1988)
Wuroemae 4: Thunder V Operation (우뢰매 4탄 썬더브이 출동 Uroemae 4 tan Sseondeo-beu-i) (1987)
Operation of Alien Uremae (외계에서 온 우뢰매 전격쓰리작전 Oegye-eseo On Uroemae Jeon-gyeongsseurijakjeon) (1987)
A Journey (여로 Yoro) (1986)
Wuroemae from the Outside, Part II (외계에서 온 우뢰매 2 Oegye-eseo On Uroemae 2) (1986)
Wuroemae from the Outside (외계에서 온 우뢰매 Oegye-eseo On Uroemae) (1986)
Beggar of the Last Year (작년에 왔던 각설이 Jaknyeon-e Watdeon Gakseori) (1985)
Beggar's Song (각설이 품바타령 Gakseori Pumbataryeong) (1984)

Variety shows
 2010: Running Man (SBS)
 2020: King of Mask Singer (MBC)

References 

 
 

 
Shim Hyung-Rae Finds a Home For His 디워 (D-War) at twitchfilm.net, February 26, 2006.

External links

South Korean screenwriters
South Korean film producers
South Korean film directors
South Korean male film actors
South Korean comedians
Slapstick comedians
People from Seoul
1958 births
Living people